The Russia national under-17 football team, controlled by the Russian Football Union, representa Russia at the UEFA European Under-17 Championship, FIFA U-17 World Cup and international friendly match fixtures at the under-17 age level.

On 28 February 2022, accordance with a "recommendation" by the International Olympic Committee (IOC), FIFA and UEFA suspended the participation of Russia, including in the Qatar 2022 World Cup. The Russian Football Union unsuccessfully appealed the FIFA and UEFA bans to the Court of Arbitration for Sport, which upheld the bans.

History

UEFA U-17 Championship Record

FIFA U-17 World Cup Record

*Draws include knockout matches decided by penalty shoot-out.
**Gold background colour indicates that the tournament was won. Red border colour indicates tournament was held on home soil.

Honours
 FIFA U-17 World Cup
 Winners: 1987 (as Soviet Union)
 FIFA Fair Play Award: 1987
 UEFA European Under-17 Championship
 Winners: 1985 (as Soviet Union), 2006, 2013
 Golden player: Anton Mitryushkin (2013)

Current squad
The following players were selected for the friendly matches against North Macedonia on 26 and 28 March 2021.

References

European national under-17 association football teams
U17
1993 establishments in Russia
Association football clubs established in 1993